Dahe is a town under the administration of Luquan District of Shijiazhuang in southwestern Hebei province, China, located in the northwestern suburbs of Shijiazhuang and just east of G5 Beijing–Kunming Expressway. , it has 26 villages under its administration.

See also
List of township-level divisions of Hebei

References

Township-level divisions of Hebei